is a Japanese manga series written and illustrated by Mari Okazaki. The series is set in the Heian period and follows two prominent Buddhist monks: 
Saichō, who founded the Enryaku-ji temple, and Kūkai, who established the Mount Kōya temple. It was serialized in Shogakukan's seinen manga magazine Monthly Big Comic Spirits from May 2014 to May 2021.

Publication
A-un, written and illustrated by Mari Okazaki, was serialized in Shogakukan's seinen manga magazine Monthly Big Comic Spirits from May 27, 2014, to May 27, 2021. Shogakukan has collected its chapters in fourteen tankōbon volumes, released from October 10, 2014, to September 10, 2021.

Volume list

Reception
The series was commended by manga authors Ryoko Yamagishi, Yuki Suetsugu and Masami Yuki and writers Rio Shimamoto and Kazuki Kaneshiro. It was one of the Jury Recommended Works at the 23rd Japan Media Arts Festival in 2020.

References

Further reading

External links
 

Buddhism in fiction
Heian period in fiction
Historical anime and manga
Seinen manga
Shogakukan manga